K. Ravishankar was an Indian politician and former Member of the Legislative Assembly. He was elected to the Tamil Nadu legislative assembly as a Dravida Munnetra Kazhagam candidate from Vilathikulam constituency in 1996 election.

Then he joined ADMK and now he is in jail on a theft case.

References 

Dravida Munnetra Kazhagam politicians
Living people
Year of birth missing (living people)